The Fiesta de la Hispanidad or Hispanic-Latin American Festival is Australia's largest celebration of Spanish and Latin American culture, held in Jonhston Street, Fitzroy in Melbourne on the second last week of November.
 
The carnival features a spectacular procession of exotic floats, costumes, musicians and dancers.
The event incorporates elements of Latin American culture, featuring dance rhythms, food and music.
Throughout the day, a mixture of musicians perform on the stage set up at the end of Johnston Street. A large number live bands and DJs perform on the stage.
Inspired by the commemoration of One Thousand years of the Spanish Language, Fiesta de la Hispanidad was officially established in 1978.

The Hispanic-Latin American Festival makes a significant contribution to the vibrancy and richness of Australia's multicultural society, depicting cultural and artistic expression.

The celebration went on hiatus in 2020.

External links
Fiesta de la Hispanidad official site
eMelbourne-Spanish

Festivals in Melbourne
Annual events in Australia
Parades in Australia
1978 establishments in Australia
Recurring events established in 1978
Spring (season) events in Australia